SŽ class 711 is a diesel multiple unit, produced by MBB Donauwörth in 1970 and currently operating in the Slovenian Railways (SŽ). The technical design is based on Germany's Deutsche Bahn class 624.

External links 
Technical details

Diesel multiple units of Slovenia